Valerio Lorenzo Rosseti (born 5 August 1994), known as Lorenzo Rosseti, is an Italian professional footballer who plays as a striker for  club Latina.

Club career
Rosseti was signed by defending Serie A champions Juventus in August 2014 as a free agent; he was released by Siena in July after the club was not admit 2014–15 professional league. On 29 August 2014 Rosseti joined fellow Serie A club Atalanta.

On 21 July 2015 Rosseti was signed by Serie B club A.C. Cesena in a temporary deal. On 6 August 2016 he was signed by FC Lugano in a temporary deal after a month with Juventus's pre-season camp, having scored a goal against South China AA in a friendly.

On 5 October 2020 he signed with Como.

On 20 August 2021, he joined Latina.

Honours
Como
 Serie C: 2020–21 (Group A)

References

External links

1994 births
Living people
Sportspeople from Arezzo
Italian footballers
Association football forwards
Serie A players
Serie B players
Serie C players
A.C.N. Siena 1904 players
Juventus F.C. players
Atalanta B.C. players
A.C. Cesena players
Ascoli Calcio 1898 F.C. players
Como 1907 players
Latina Calcio 1932 players
Swiss Super League players
FC Lugano players
Italian expatriate footballers
Italian expatriate sportspeople in Switzerland
Expatriate footballers in Switzerland
Italy youth international footballers
Italy under-21 international footballers
Footballers from Tuscany